The 2008 National Football Challenge Cup was the 18th season of National Football Challenge Cup, the main cup tournament in Pakistani football.

Pakistan Telecommunication were the defending champions, winning the 2005 edition, although their team was dissolved in the end of 2005 season. Thus there was no defending champions.

All the matches were played in CDGK Stadium and Peoples Football Stadium in Karachi.

Group stage

Group A

Group B

Group C

Group D

Knockout round

Quarterfinals

Semifinals

Third place match

Final

References

Pakistan National Football Challenge Cup
Cup